The Jeremy Kyle Show is a daytime television tabloid talk show presented by Jeremy Kyle that debuted in the United States and Canada on September 19, 2011. The series was based on Kyle's British talk series of the same name. The series was taped in New York. The program was a co-production of ITV Studios' U.S. subsidiary, ITV Studios America and Debmar-Mercury, which served as distributor for the U.S. version while ITV kept all international rights.

Synopsis
As with the UK version, the series used a confrontational style, which saw guests attempt to resolve interpersonal relationship issues, such as family, relationship, sex, drug, alcohol and other issues. "Guest Support" was provided by psychiatrist Dr Janet Taylor.

The show's style was one of the reasons why Fox and Debmar-Mercury saw potential in adapting Kyle's show to the United States as a replacement for Oprah. By November 2010, the series was picked up in over 70% of American television markets, well ahead of its September 2011 debut. Kyle also had competition among three other tabloid talkers, already established veterans (and all distributed by NBCUniversal Television Distribution), Jerry Springer, The Steve Wilkos Show and Maury.

Like other tabloid talk shows, Jeremy Kyle aired primarily on affiliates of Fox, The CW and MyNetworkTV. Only a scattered number of ABC, CBS and NBC stations in smaller markets aired it, with only a few using it to fill their former Oprah timeslot.

On November 17, 2011, the show was renewed for a second season.

Cancellation
The Jeremy Kyle Show was cancelled on December 18, 2012, with the final episode airing in May 2013. In a joint-statement to Broadcasting and Cable, Debmar-Mercury co-presidents Mort Marcus and Ira Bernstein said, "We can confirm the U.S. version of The Jeremy Kyle Show won't be returning for a third season. This is in no way a reflection of the quality of the show. Backed by a first-rate production team, Jeremy was amazing and showed all of us why he is such a rock star in the UK. Simply put, Jeremy is one of the best hosts we have ever seen, and we expect to see more of him on U.S. television in the years ahead. Unfortunately, talk shows like this simply take time to build and, while we were seeing ratings progress in many markets, it wasn't enough to justify going forward with another season."

Initial reception
Before its American debut, Broadcasting & Cable writer Ben Grossman noted in his article that his show could be a threat to Anderson Cooper's syndicated talk show, which debuted in the same season (and ran for two years just like Kyle's did), and yet another confrontational tabloid talk veteran, Jerry Springer, whom Kyle replaced back in the UK when Springer's version of his American talk show aired there.

References

2010s American television talk shows
2011 American television series debuts
2013 American television series endings
American television series based on British television series
First-run syndicated television programs in the United States
English-language television shows
Television series by ITV Studios
Television series by Lionsgate Television